Dingziwan is a subdistrict of the Wangcheng district, Changsha, Hunan China, located on the eastern bank of the Xiang River. The subdistrict is bordered by the Tongguan Subdistrict to the north; the town of Qiaoyi to the east; the Qingzhuhu subdistrict of the Kaifu district to the south; and the Gaotangling, Baishazhou, and Dazehu subdistricts across the Xiang River to the west.

History 
The Xianing sub-division was a controlled district of Wangcheng county, which was created by merging various townships and villages. In June 1995, the Dingzi township and Shutang township were merged into Dingzi town. In May 2012,  Dingzi town was renamed as Dingzi subdistrict.

In August 2012, the Dingzi subdistrict was divided into the subdistricts of Dingziwan and Shutangshan. The Dingziwan subdistrict has an area of  containing two residential communities and three villages, with a total population of about 31,000 people.

References

 

Township-level divisions of Wangcheng
Subdistricts of Changsha